Katayoun Riahi (born ) is an Iranian actress. She has received various accolades, including three Hafez Awards, in addition to nomination for an Iran Cinema Celebration Award. She is also the founder and CEO of the Komak Charity Foundation and an ambassador of the Mehrafarin Foundation in Iran.

Career
It was with the series Days of Life (1998), After the Rain (1999) and The 10th Night (2001) that she established herself as a capable actress.

She also played a starring role in the series Prophet Joseph (2009).

Many critics believe that Riyahi's best performance was in the movie The Last Supper (2001), a role which brought her a Best Actress nomination at the 20th Fajr International Film Festival.

Her outstanding performance in the movie This Woman Won't Talk (2002) wins a nomination for the Best Actress Award at the 7th Iran Cinema Celebration.

Riyahi has also appeared in a number of movies, including The Stranger (1987), Apartment 13 (1990), The Kind Moon (1995), Lighter Than Darkness (2002) and Invitation (2008).

Arrest 

Katayoun Riahi was one of the first celebrities who took off her hijab amidst the 2022 nationwide protests and in support of the people wrote: "Iranian women are the voices of one another" and "Enough with the lies"!  Security forces arrested her in her villa in the suburbs of Qazvin. Her arrest took place about two months after the security officers' attempt to arrest her in her house, but according to reports she had managed to escape in time.

Filmography

Film

Television

2009 khazan
2008 Shirin
2008 Invitation 
2003 My Lady 
2003 Somewhere Else 
2002 The Last Supper 
1992 Ghafele 
1992 Tamas-e Sheytani 
1989 Kashtee-ye Angelica 
1987 Gharibe h
1987 Payizan

References

External links

1961 births
Living people
People from Tehran
Actresses from Tehran
Iranian women writers
Iranian film actresses
Iranian television actresses
Mahsa Amini protests
Political prisoners in Iran
20th-century Iranian actresses